Antonín Liška (17 September 1924, Bohumilice – 15 October 2003, České Budějovice) was a Czech Catholic clergyman. From 1991 to 2002 he was the bishop of České Budějovice.

Sources
http://www.catholic-hierarchy.org/bishop/bliska.html
http://www.bcb.cz/Dieceze/Dieceze/Diecezni-biskupove?PHPSESSID=51h1es5ka85jdo3nub2r0fn8e1

1924 births
2003 deaths
People from Prachatice District
Bishops of České Budějovice
20th-century Roman Catholic bishops in the Czech Republic
21st-century Roman Catholic bishops in the Czech Republic